Christian Skolmen (born 28 October 1970) is a Norwegian film, stage, television and voice actor who has been part of the Nationaltheatret since 1995, where he has appeared in The Pretenders (Ibsen), the Three Musketeers (Dumas) and Bakkantinnene (Euripides). He has also performed at the Torshovteatret in Ondskapen (Guillou), and the Trøndelag Teater in Peer Gynt (Ibsen).

On TV, Skolmen has appeared in Hunter (NRK), Hombres (TV-Norge) and in Sejer (NRK), based on the series of novels by Karin Fossum. He is the son of artist Jon Skolmen.

In summer 2008, Christian Skolmen appeared in Populærmusikk fra Vittula at the Christiania Theatre.

Selected filmography
2003: Buddy
2004: Monstertorsdag
2006: Miracle
2008: Ulvenatten

Dubbing Roles

Animated films
2007 TMNT - Max Winters

References

1970 births
Living people
Norwegian male film actors
Norwegian male stage actors
Norwegian male television actors
Norwegian male voice actors